Khazineh Anbar may refer to:
 Khazineh Anbar-e Jadid
 Khazineh Anbar-e Qadim